Lithuania participated in the Eurovision Song Contest 2016 with the song "I've Been Waiting for This Night" written by Jonas Thander and Beatrice Robertsson. The song was performed by Donny Montell, who previously represented Lithuania in the 2012 contest with the song "Love Is Blind", placing 14th in the final. The Lithuanian broadcaster Lithuanian National Radio and Television (LRT) organised the national final "Eurovizijos" dainų konkurso nacionalinė atranka (Eurovision Song Contest national selection) in order to select the Lithuanian entry for the 2016 contest in Stockholm, Sweden. The national final took place over 10 weeks and involved 28 artists competing in two different competitive streams: artists that applied with a song and artists that were matched with a song from the song submissions LRT received because they did not have a song. The results of each show were determined by the combination of votes from a jury panel and a public vote. In the final, six artists and songs remained and "I've Been Waiting For This Night" performed by Donny Montell was selected as the winner.

Lithuania was drawn to compete in the second semi-final of the Eurovision Song Contest which took place on 12 May 2016. Performing during the show in position 9, "I've Been Waiting for This Night" was announced among the top 10 entries of the second semi-final and therefore qualified to compete in the final on 14 May. It was later revealed that Lithuania placed fourth out of the 18 participating countries in the semi-final with 222 points. In the final, Lithuania performed in position 16 and placed ninth out of the 26 participating countries, scoring 200 points.

Background 

Prior to the 2016 contest, Lithuania had participated in the Eurovision Song Contest 16 times since its first entry in 1994. The nation’s best placing in the contest was sixth, which it achieved in 2006 with the song "We Are the Winners" performed by LT United. In the 2015 contest, "This Time" performed by Monika Linkytė and Vaidas Baumila qualified to the final where the song scored 30 points and placed 18th.
 
For the 2016 contest, the Lithuanian national broadcaster, Lithuanian National Radio and Television (LRT), broadcast the event within Lithuania and organised the selection process for the nation's entry. Other than the internal selection of their debut entry in 1994, Lithuania has selected their entry consistently through a national final procedure. LRT confirmed their intentions to participate at the 2016 Eurovision Song Contest on 13 July 2015. On 6 October 2015, the broadcaster announced the organization of "Eurovizijos" dainų konkurso nacionalinė atranka, which would be the national final to select Lithuania's entry for Stockholm.

Before Eurovision

"Eurovizijos" dainų konkurso nacionalinė atranka 
"Eurovizijos" dainų konkurso nacionalinė atranka (Eurovision Song Contest national selection) was the national final format developed by LRT in order to select Lithuania's entry for the Eurovision Song Contest 2016. The competition involved a ten-week-long process that commenced on 9 January 2016 and concluded with a winning song and artist on 12 March 2016. The 10 shows took place at the LRT studios in Vilnius and were hosted by Andrius Rožickas and Gerūta Griniūtė. The shows were broadcast on LRT televizija, LRT Lituanica and LRT Radijas as well as online via the broadcaster's website lrt.lt. The final was also streamed online at the official Eurovision Song Contest website eurovision.tv.

Format
The Lithuanian broadcaster overhauled the format of the national final from that of previous years. For the 2016 competition, entries initially competed in two different subgroups: artists that entered without a song and artists that entered with a song. Artists that entered with a song were higher in number (16) and therefore two shows consisting of eight entries each were held on 9 and 16 January resulting in the elimination of six entries all together. The remaining 10 entries participated in an additional two shows on 30 January and 13 February where first two and then three of the entries were eliminated, leaving five entries remaining in the group. The remaining 12 artists applied without a song and were matched with songs that LRT received during the submission period. An initial show was organised for this subgroup on 30 January resulting in the elimination of two entries. The remaining 10 entries in this group participated in an additional two shows on 6 and 20 February where first two and then three of the entries were eliminated, leaving five entries remaining in the group. During the eighth show, the remaining five entries from each group participated together for the first time and the bottom two entries were eliminated, while the remaining eight entries advanced to the competition's semi-final. In the semi-final, an additional two entries were eliminated and the top six proceeded to the final. In the final, the winner was selected from the remaining six entries.

The results of each of the 10 shows were determined by the 50/50 combination of votes from a jury panel and public televoting. The ranking developed by both streams of voting was converted to points from 1-8, 10 and 12 and assigned based on the number of competing songs in the respective show. During the first eight shows, the jury votes consisted of a combination of a Lithuanian jury panel consisting of four members and an international jury panel consisting of three members. For the semi-final, the jury votes were determined by a five-member Lithuanian panel only. In the final, a six-member Lithuanian panel and a three-member international panel voted.  The public could vote through telephone and SMS voting. Initially, ties in all shows but the final were to be decided in favour of the entry that received the most votes from the public, however, during some shows, ties were decided in favour of the entry that received the most points from the jury, while in the final, a tie would be decided in favour of the entry that was awarded the most points by the jury.

Competing entries
On 6 October 2015, LRT opened two separate submission forms: one for artists and another for songwriters to submit their songs. Artists that applied to compete with a song were required to indicate which song they wanted to compete with on their application. The submission deadline for both applications concluded on 1 December 2015. On 21 December 2015, LRT announced the 28 artists selected for the competition during a press conference. Among the artists were previous Lithuanian Eurovision contestants Erica Jennings, who represented Lithuania in 2001 as part of Skamp, and Donny Montell, who represented the nation in 2012. On 19 January 2016, the final changes to the list of 28 competing acts were made with the addition of Dovydas Petrošius and Evelyn Joyce to the list of performers and the withdrawal of the girl group HIT and singer Gabrielė Grygolaitytė-Vasha. Singer Aistė Pilvelytė was originally assigned to perform the song "You Can't Leave Me Now" written by Niklas Bergvist, however, she later opted to switch her song. Eglė Jakštytė originally entered the competition with "Leisk dar būti", a song entirely in Lithuanian, but decided to translate the song to English after the second show.

Shows

Elimination shows
The eight elimination shows of the competition aired between 9 January and 27 February 2016 and featured the 28 competing entries. The first, second, fourth and sixth show featured artists who already had a song when they applied to compete, while the third, fifth and seventh show featured artists that did not have songs when they applied to compete. The eighth show featured all remaining entries in the competition. The members of the Lithuanian jury consisted of Darius Užkuraitis (LRT Opus director; all shows), Ramūnas Zilnys (music reviewer; all shows), Donatas Ulvydas (director; first show), Dalia Michelevičiūtė (actress; first show), Nomeda Kazlaus (opera singer; second, third and sixth to eighth shows), Laima Lapkauskaitė (producer; second to fourth shows), Vaidas Baumila (singer; second show), Kazimieras Šiaulys (music critic and journalist; fourth show), Gintaras Rinkevičius (director; fifth show), Olegas Aleksejevas (member of the group Biplan; fifth show), Valdas Burnys (member of the group Išjunk šviesą; sixth show), Dalia Ibelhauptaitė (director and playwright; seventh show) and Justė Arlauskaitė (singer; eighth show). International jury members included Peter Freudenthaler (lead singer of the German group Fools Garden; first to fourth and sixth shows), Denis Ingoldsby (British producer; first and third to fifth shows), Dave Holmes (British guitarist; first, third, fourth and eighth shows), Syron (British singer; second, fourth and sixth show), Karl Frierson (American member of German jazz ensemble De-Phazz; second and fourth show), Vanessa Lancaster (vocalist for the British jazz-pop ensemble Touch and Go; third show), Karlis Auzans (Latvian musician and composer; fifth and sixth show), Will Wells (American producer and musician, touring member of Imagine Dragons; seventh and eighth show) and Brainstorm (eighth show).

The bottom three entries of the first two shows were eliminated, while two were eliminated between the third to fifth shows, three were eliminated in the sixth and seventh shows and two were eliminated following the eighth show. 2000 Latvian Eurovision entrant Brainstorm performed as the interval act during the seventh show.

Semi-final
The semi-final of the competition took place on 5 March 2016 and featured the remaining eight entries that qualified from the eighth show. The semi-final was the first show in the competition to be broadcast live; all other preceding shows were pre-recorded earlier in the week before their airdates. Jury voting in the semi-final was decided by a five-member Lithuanian panel only; no international jurors were included. The members of the jury consisted of Darius Užkuraitis (LRT Opus director), Dalia Ibelhauptaitė (director and playwright), Ramūnas Zilnys (music reviewer), Justė Arlauskaitė (singer) and Tomas Sinickis (musician, singer-songwriter). The top six entries advanced to the final, while the bottom two were eliminated. In addition to the performances of the competing entries, Vidas Bareikis performed as the interval act.

Final
The final of the competition took place on 12 March 2016 and featured the remaining six entries that qualified from the semi-final. Jury voting in the final was decided by a six-member Lithuanian panel and a three-member international panel. The members of the Lithuanian panel consist of Ramūnas Zilnys (music reviewer), Nomeda Kazlaus (opera singer), Dalia Ibelhauptaitė (director and playwright), Justė Arlauskaitė (singer), Tomas Sinickis (musician, singer-songwriter) and Vaidas Baumila (singer). The international panel consisted of Peter Freudenthaler (lead singer of the German group Fools Garden), Denis Ingoldsby (British producer) and Syron (British singer). "I've Been Waiting for This Night" performed by Donny Montell was selected as the winner after gaining the most points from both the jury vote and the public vote. In addition to the performances of the competing entries, Vaidas Baumila and Monika Linkytė opened the show with the 2015 Lithuanian Eurovision entry "This Time" and international juror Syron performed as the interval act.

Preparation
Following Donny Montell's win during the Lithuanian national final, discussions began in regards to the staging of the song with choreographer Sacha Jean-Baptiste. Baptiste also directed Montell's music video for "I've Been Waiting for this Night", which was released earlier on 4 December 2015. Montell flew to Sweden in late March and throughout April to rehearse the choreography, which included tests for a jump performed on a trampoline.

On 28 March, LRT broadcast the support concert Būkime kartu where Lithuanian viewers could call to donate funds to support the Lithuanian Eurovision participation. The concert was filmed on 26 March at the Žalgiris Arena in Kaunas and featured guests Edgaras Montvidas, Gytis Valickas and the 2015 Lithuanian Eurovision entrants Monika Linkytė and Vaidas Baumila. The concert raised €10,004 from the public donations with phone lines remaining open until 31 March for additional donations.

Promotion
Donny Montell focused his promotional efforts in the lead up to the Eurovision Song Contest within Lithuania. Montell performed a concert tour of Lithuania to promote his album #BLCK, which was released on 14 April 2016. In addition to his concerts, Montell recorded a performance of "I've Been Waiting for This Night" for the LRT programme Dainų dainelės, which aired on 10 April and he performed a show on 15 April for Lithuanian and NATO troops at the Lithuanian Air Force Aviation Base in Šiauliai.

In addition to his appearances within Lithuania, Donny Montell also promoted "I've Been Waiting for This Night" between 11 and 13 April by taking part in promotional activities in Tel Aviv, Israel and performing during the Israel Calling event held at the Ha'teatron venue.

At Eurovision 

According to Eurovision rules, all nations with the exceptions of the host country and the "Big Five" (France, Germany, Italy, Spain and the United Kingdom) are required to qualify from one of two semi-finals in order to compete for the final; the top 10 countries from each semi-final progress to the final. The European Broadcasting Union (EBU) split up the competing countries into six different pots based on voting patterns from previous contests, with countries with favourable voting histories put into the same pot. On 25 January 2016, a special allocation draw was held which placed each country into one of the two semi-finals, as well as which half of the show they would perform in. Lithuania was placed into the second semi-final, to be held on 12 May 2016, and was scheduled to perform in the first half of the show.

Once all the competing songs for the 2016 contest had been released, the running order for the semi-finals was decided by the shows' producers rather than through another draw, so that similar songs were not placed next to each other. Lithuania was set to perform in position 9, following the entry from Macedonia and before the entry from Australia.

The two semi-finals and final were broadcast in Lithuania on LRT, LRT HD and LRT Radijas with commentary by Darius Užkuraitis. LRT Kultūra also broadcast the three shows interpreted in International Sign for the deaf and sign language users. The Lithuanian spokesperson, who announced the top 12-point score awarded by the Lithuanian jury during the final, was Ugnė Galadauskaitė.

Semi-final

Donny Montell took part in technical rehearsals on 4 and 7 May, followed by dress rehearsals on 11 and 12 May. This included the jury show on 11 May where the professional juries of each country watched and voted on the competing entries.

The Lithuanian performance featured Donny Montell performing on stage alone with blue and green stage colours and the LED screens displaying stars. The performance also featured pyrotechnic effects and Montell using a trampoline prop to perform a jump. The stage director and choreographer for the Lithuanian performance was Sacha Jean-Baptiste. Donny Montell was joined by four off-stage backing vocalists: Justina Budaitė, Kotryna Juodzevičiūtė, Rasa Doniela and Karolina Rasten.

At the end of the show, Lithuania was announced as having finished in the top 10 and subsequently qualifying for the grand final. It was later revealed that Lithuania placed fourth in the semi-final, receiving a total of 222 points: 118 points from the televoting and 104 points from the juries.

Final
Shortly after the second semi-final, a winners' press conference was held for the 10 qualifying countries. As part of this press conference, the qualifying artists took part in a draw to determine which half of the grand final they would subsequently participate in. This draw was done in the reverse order the countries appeared in the semi-final running order. Lithuania was drawn to compete in the second half. Following this draw, the shows' producers decided upon the running order of the final, as they had done for the semi-finals. Lithuania was subsequently placed to perform in position 16, following the entry from Serbia and before the entry from Croatia.

Donny Montell once again took part in dress rehearsals on 13 and 14 May before the final, including the jury final where the professional juries cast their final votes before the live show. Donny Montell performed a repeat of his semi-final performance during the final on 14 May. Lithuania placed ninth in the final, scoring 200 points: 96 points from the televoting and 104 points from the juries, making it the second most successful result for Lithuania in the contest to date.

Voting
Voting during the three shows was conducted under a new system that involved each country now awarding two sets of points from 1-8, 10 and 12: one from their professional jury and the other from televoting. Each nation's jury consisted of five music industry professionals who are citizens of the country they represent, with their names published before the contest to ensure transparency. This jury judged each entry based on: vocal capacity; the stage performance; the song's composition and originality; and the overall impression by the act. In addition, no member of a national jury was permitted to be related in any way to any of the competing acts in such a way that they cannot vote impartially and independently. The individual rankings of each jury member as well as the nation's televoting results were released shortly after the grand final.

Below is a breakdown of points awarded to Lithuania and awarded by Lithuania in the second semi-final and grand final of the contest, and the breakdown of the jury voting and televoting conducted during the two shows:

Points awarded to Lithuania

Points awarded by Lithuania

Detailed voting results
The following members comprised the Lithuanian jury:
 Nomeda Kazlaus (jury chairperson)pianist, opera singer
 songwriter, vocal coach
 Justas Čekuolisguitarist, songwriter, producer, musician 
 Vytautas LukočiusConductor of Lithuanian chamber orchestra
 Eglė Nepaitė-Abaravičienėmusic producer

References

External links 

2016
Countries in the Eurovision Song Contest 2016
Eurovision